The 2nd Battalion, 320th Field Artillery Regiment (2-320th FAR) is an inactive field artillery battalion of the United States Army. The battalion has been assigned to the 82nd Airborne Division, 11th Airborne Division and 101st Airborne Division. The battalion has participated in World War I, World War II, Vietnam, Operation Desert Storm, Operation Iraqi Freedom, and Operation Enduring Freedom. The battalion deactivated in July 2015 as part of ongoing force reductions, and its personnel and equipment were reflagged as the 2nd Battalion, 32nd Field Artillery Regiment.

History

World War I
The 2-320th FAR's beginnings can be traced back to America's entry into the First World War. As part of the nation's mobilization, 2-320th was constituted, organized and activated in August 1917 as Battery B, 320th Field Artillery (B/320th FA). As part of the original 82nd Division, B/320th FA played a key role at Lorraine, St. Mihiel, and the Meuse Argonne region in France. Following the Armistice, the 320th FA demobilized, only to be reconstituted in June 1921 as part of the United States Organized Reserves.

World War II
In August 1942, when the 82nd Infantry Division was converted to an airborne division, the 320th FA (including B/320th) was reorganized and redesignated as the 320th Glider Field Artillery Battalion (GFAB). As part of the 82nd Airborne Division, the 320th GFAB fought in a number of hot spots. First, the 320th GFAB was part of the campaign in Sicily, acting in reserve. The unit first saw action at the Volturno River on the Italian mainland. The crucial Normandy invasion was the next stop for the 320th GFAB. Under difficult conditions, the unit helped make the invasion a success. As a result of the 320th's actions during Operation Overlord, the unit was awarded the Presidential Unit Citation. The 320th GFAB next fought in Operation Market Garden and then the Battle of the Bulge when the Germans attempted their last-ditch offensive. The 320th GFAB then fought and played a role in the final push through the Rhineland to defeat Germany. Upon the war's end the unit completed its duties in Europe as part of the post-war occupation in Berlin.

Post-World War II
After the war, the 320th GFAB went through a number of transitions. It was inactivated on 15 December 1948 and relieved from assignment to the 82nd Airborne Division on 14 December 1950. On 1 August 1951 it was reorganized and redesignated as the 320th Airborne Field Artillery Battalion (AFAB), and activated at Fort Benning, Georgia.

Post-Korean War
During the 1950s, the 320th FA served as the field artillery battalion of the separate 508th Airborne Regimental Combat Team. When the Army eliminated infantry regiments and battalions from division and organized under the Pentomic structure, the 320th Field Artillery was reorganized as a parent regiment under the Combat Arms Regimental System. B/320th FA was assigned to the 11th Airborne Division in Germany. B/320th FA was inactivated on 1 July 1958 in Germany when the 11th Airborne was inactivated and replaced by the 24th Infantry Division. B/320th FA were redesignated on 15 November 1962 as Headquarters and Headquarters Battery, 2nd Battalion, 320th Artillery, and assigned to the 101st Airborne Division (organic elements concurrently constituted).

Post-Vietnam

Gulf War
2-320 FAR next saw action in the Middle East from 1990 until 1991. As a part of the 101st Airborne Division (Air Assault), the battalion was part of the massive US force that drove the Iraqi Army from Kuwait.

Operation Iraqi Freedom I
The battalion served honorably in Operation Iraqi Freedom. As a member of the famed 101st Airborne Division, the battalion deployed 3 times to Iraq in support of the operation, to include the initial push into the country 24 March 2003.

Lineage and honors

Lineage
Constituted 5 August 1917 in the National Army as Battery B, 320th Field Artillery, an element of the 82d Division
Organized 29 August 1917 at Camp Gordon, Georgia
Demobilized 12 May 1919 at Camp Dix, New Jersey
Reconstituted 24 June 1921 in the Organized Reserves as Battery B, 320th Field Artillery, an element of the 82d Division (later redesignated as the 82d Airborne Division)
Organized in December 1921 at Columbia, South Carolina
Reorganized and redesignated 13 February 1942 as Battery B, 320th Field Artillery Battalion
Ordered into active military service 25 March 1942 and reorganized at Camp Claiborne, Louisiana
Reorganized and redesignated 15 August 1942 as Battery B, 320th Glider Field Artillery Battalion
(Organized Reserves redesignated 25 March 1948 as the Organized Reserve Corps)
Withdrawn 15 November 1948 from the Organized Reserve Corps and allotted to the Regular Army
Inactivated 15 December 1948 at Fort Bragg, North Carolina
(320th Glider Field Artillery Battalion relieved 14 December 1950 from assignment to the 82d Airborne Division)
Redesignated 1 August 1951 as Battery B, 320th Airborne Field Artillery Battalion, and activated at Fort Benning, Georgia
Reorganized and redesignated 1 March 1957 as Battery B, 320th Artillery, and assigned to the 11th Airborne Division
Inactivated 1 July 1958 in Germany and relieved from assignment to the 11th Airborne Division
Redesignated 15 November 1962 as Headquarters and Headquarters Battery, 2d Battalion, 320th Artillery, and assigned to the 101st Airborne Division (organic elements concurrently constituted)
Battalion activated 3 December 1962 at Fort Campbell, Kentucky
Redesignated 1 September 1971 as the 2d Battalion, 320th Field Artillery
Relieved 16 September 2004 from assignment to the 101st Airborne Division and assigned to the 1st Brigade Combat Team, 101st Airborne Division

Campaign Participation Credit
World War I: St. Mihiel; Meuse-Argonne; Lorraine 1918
World War II: Sicily; Naples-Foggia; Normandy (with arrowhead); Rhineland (with arrowhead); Ardennes-Alsace; Central Europe
Vietnam: Defense; Counteroffensive; Counteroffensive, Phase II; Counteroffensive, Phase III; Tet Counteroffensive; Counteroffensive, Phase IV; Counteroffensive, Phase V; Counteroffensive, Phase VI; Tet 69/Counteroffensive; Summer-Fall 1969; Winter Spring 1970; Sanctuary Counteroffensive; Counteroffensive, Phase VII; Consolidation I; Consolidation II
Southwest Asia: Defense of Saudi Arabia; Liberation and Defense of Kuwait
War on Terrorism
Afghanistan: Afghan Consolidation III
Iraq: Liberation of Iraq, Transition of Iraq, Iraqi Governance, Iraqi Surge

Note: The published Army lineage, dated 30 June 2010, shows only Iraqi Governance in the War on Terrorism. Comparison of the battalion's deployment dates with the War on Terrorism campaigns estimates that the battalion will be credited with participation in the additional campaigns listed.

Decorations
  Presidential Unit Citation (Army), Streamer embroidered STE. MERE EGLISE
  Presidential Unit Citation (Army), Streamer embroidered DAK TO
  Valorous Unit Award, Streamer embroidered TUY HOA
  Meritorius Unit Commendation (Army), Streamer embroidered VIETNAM 1965-1966
  Meritorious Unit Commendation (Army), Streamer embroidered SOUTHWEST ASIA 1990-1991
  Meritorious Unit Commendation (Army), Streamer embroidered IRAQ 2003
  Meritorious Unit Commendation (Army), Streamer embroidered IRAQ 2007-2008
  Meritorious Unit Commendation (Army), Streamer embroidered AFGHANISTAN 2010-2011
  French Crois de Guerre with Palm, World War II, Streamer embroidered STE. MERE EGLISE 
  French Crois de Guerre with Palm, World War II, Streamer embroidered COTENTIN
  French Crois de Guerre, World War II Fourrragere
 Military Order of William (Degree of the Knight of the Fourth Class), Streamer embroidered NIJMEGEN 1944
 Netherlands Orange Lanyard
  Belgian Fourragere 1940
 Cited in the Order of the Day of the Belgian Army for action in the Ardennes
 Cited in the Order of the Day of the Belgian Army for action in Belgium
  Republic of Vietnam Cross of Gallantry with Palm, Streamer embroidered VIETNAM 1968-1969
  Republic of Vietnam Cross of Gallantry with Palm, Streamer embroidered VIETNAM 1971
  Republic of Vietnam Civil Action Honor Medal, First Class, Streamer embroidered VIETNAM 1968-1970
Battery A additionally entitled to:
  Republic of Vietnam Cross of Gallantry with Palm, Streamer embroidered VIETNAM 1966-1967

Note: Separately cited decorations are not post to the official lineage by the Center for Military History.

Heraldry

Distinctive unit insignia
320th Field Artillery Regiment Distinctive Unit Insignia

Coat of arms
320th Field Artillery Regiment Coat of Arms

See also
 Field Artillery Branch (United States)

References

External links
320th FAR Regimental Association
Official Unit Facebook Page

320 2
Military units and formations established in 1917
Military units and formations disestablished in 2015